Eden Township is the name of multiple townships in the U.S. state of Minnesota:
Eden Township, Brown County, Minnesota
Eden Township, Pipestone County, Minnesota
Eden Township, Polk County, Minnesota

See also
Eden Township (disambiguation)

Minnesota township disambiguation pages